The SMU Mustangs women's basketball team represents Southern Methodist University in women's basketball. The school competes in the American Athletic Conference in Division I of the National Collegiate Athletic Association (NCAA). The Mustangs play home basketball games at the Moody Coliseum in Dallas, Texas.

Season-by-season record
As of the 2015–16 season, the Mustangs have a 611–560 all-time record, with a 257–257 conference record and NCAA Tournament appearances in 1994, 1995, 1996, 1998, 1999, 2000, and 2008 and six appearances in the Women's National Invitation Tournament.

Roster
1 Makenzie Ellis
2 Ariana Whitfield
3 Savannah Ellis
4 Amber Bacon
5 Alexis Legget
10 Alicia Froling
12 Morgan Smith
14 Paige Bayliss
22 Marie Olsen
23 BriShonne Tollie
24 JaQuia White
32 Kayla White
33 Johnasia Cash

NCAA tournament results

References

External links